Anastasios Antonopoulos (born 1893, date of death unknown) was a Greek wrestler. He competed in the middleweight event at the 1912 Summer Olympics.

References

External links
 

1893 births
Year of death missing
Olympic wrestlers of Greece
Wrestlers at the 1912 Summer Olympics
Greek male sport wrestlers
Place of birth missing